HMS Forward was the name ship of her class of two scout cruisers built for the Royal Navy in the first decade of the 20th century. The ship was in reserve for most of the first decade of her existence. After the beginning of the First World War in August 1914, she was assigned to coastal defence duties on the East Coast of England. Forward was present when the Germans bombarded Hartlepool in mid-December 1914, but played no significant role in the battle. The ship was sent to the Mediterranean in mid-1915 and was then assigned to the Aegean Sea a year later, together with her sister ship, and remained there until the end of the war. After returning home in 1919, she was sold for scrap in 1921.

Design and description

The Forward-class ships were one of four classes of scout cruisers ordered by the Admiralty in 1902–1903 and 1903–1904 Naval Programmes. These ships were intended to work with destroyer flotillas, leading their torpedo attacks and backing them up when attacked by other destroyers, although they quickly became less useful as destroyer speeds increased before the First World War. Their crew consisted of 289 officers and ratings.

The ships were powered by a pair of three-cylinder triple-expansion steam engines, each driving one shaft, using steam provided by a dozen Thornycroft boilers.

The main armament of the Forward class consisted of ten quick-firing (QF) 12-pounder  18-cwt guns. Three guns were mounted abreast on the forecastle and the quarterdeck, with the remaining four guns positioned port and starboard amidships. They also carried eight 3-pounder Hotchkiss guns and two above-water 18-inch (450 mm) torpedo tubes, one on each broadside.

Construction and career
Forward was laid down on 22 October 1903 by Fairfield Shipbuilding and Engineering Company in their Govan shipyard. She was launched on 27 August 1904 and completed on 22 August 1905. Not long after completion, two additional 12-pounder guns were added and the 3-pounder guns were replaced with six QF 6-pounder Hotchkiss guns. The ship was in initially in reserve until she was assigned to the Channel Fleet in 1907. Forward became leader of the 2nd Destroyer Flotilla in early 1909, joined the 4th Destroyer Flotilla in October 1909, the 3rd Destroyer Flotilla in the Nore Command in 1910, becoming its leader in June 1913. About 1911–1912, her main guns were replaced by nine  guns, arranged four on each broadside and the remaining gun on the quarterdeck. At the start of the war she was part of the 9th Destroyer Flotilla, on the Shetland Patrol.

In 1914 she was transferred to the 7th Destroyer Flotilla on the Humber and rejoined the 9th Flotilla, now based in Hartlepool, under the command of Captain Alan Brown, who was also the captain of the scout cruiser . On 15 December 1914 Forward, Patrol and the 3rd Division of the 9th Flotilla were in Hartlepool, while the 4th Division was patrolling off Whitby. Hartlepool was a tidal harbour, and at low tide it was difficult for the cruisers to get out to sea. Brown decided that it was too dangerous for the cruisers and the submarine  to go out on patrol.

At 08:10, the German ships appeared off Hartlepool and opened fire on the town. Their initial targets were the two gun emplacements that protected the harbour, but they soon opened fire on the docks and harbour entrance. Because she already had steam up, Patrol was able to leave harbour, Forward did not and was trying to raise steam during the entire battle. When she did finally get out of Hartlepool, the German battlecruisers had already turned east to make their escape. By the time that Forward exited the harbour, they were out of sight.

After the raid Forward was sent to the 7th Destroyer Flotilla in the Humber. In May 1915 she was one of five of the seven surviving scout cruisers to make up the 6th Light Cruiser Squadron, whose duties were to guard the east coast against Zeppelin raids. This squadron was soon broken up as newer ships became available, and Forward was sent to the Mediterranean. From July 1916 to the end of the war she served in the Aegean with her sister Foresight. Early in 1919, under the command of Arthur Bedford, Forward rescued members of the Tolstoy family from the evacuation of Odessa, about to be captured by the Bolsheviks. She was sold for scrap in July 1921.

Notes

Citations

Bibliography

External links
 
 Forward class in World War I
 History of the Forward class

 

Forward-class cruisers
World War I cruisers of the United Kingdom
1904 ships
Ships built on the River Clyde